Andrzej Ehrenfeucht (born August 8, 1932) is a Polish American mathematician and computer scientist. He formulated the Ehrenfeucht–Fraïssé game, using the back-and-forth method given by Roland Fraïssé in his PhD thesis. The Ehrenfeucht–Mycielski sequence is also named after him.

Ehrenfeucht married Alfred Tarski's daughter Ina Tarski. 
In 1971 he was a founding member of the Department of Computer Science at the University of Colorado. Ehrenfeucht is currently teaching and doing research at the University of Colorado, where he runs the project "breaking away" together with Patricia Baggett. The project aims at raising high school students' interest in mathematics and technology with hands-on projects.

Two of his students, Eugene Myers and David Haussler, were contributors to the sequencing of the human genome. Haussler and Myers, along with Harold Gabow, Ross McConnell and Grzegorz Rozenberg spoke at
a two-day symposium in honor of his 80th birthday, which was organized at the University of Colorado in 2012.

Two journal issues have come out in his honor, one at his 65th birthday in Lecture Notes in Computer Science, and one at his 80th in Theoretical Computer Science.

Bibliography 
Books authored or co-authored by Ehrenfeucht include:
 Andrzej Ehrenfeucht, Tero Harju, Ion Petre, David M. Prescott and Grzegorz Rozenberg. Computation in living cells : gene assembly in ciliates. Springer, 2004. 
 Patricia Baggett and Andrzej Ehrenfeucht. Breaking Away from the Math Book: creative projects for grades K-6. 
  Andrzej Ehrenfeucht, Tero Harju, Grzegorz Rozenberg: The Theory of 2-Structures: A Framework for Decomposition and Transformation of Graphs. World Scientific, 1999. 

Ehrenfeucht's papers published in Fundamenta Mathematicae. Access through Wirtualna Biblioteka Nauki.
 Chen Chung Chang, Andrzej Ehrenfeucht, "A Characterization of Abelian Groups", Fundamenta Mathematicae 51, No. 2, ss. 141-147 (1962).
 Andrzej Ehrenfeucht, "An Application of Games to the Completeness Problem for Formalized Theories", Fundamenta Mathematicae 49, No. 2, ss. 129-141 (1960).
 Andrzej Ehrenfeucht, "On Theories Categorical in Power", Fundamenta Mathematicae 44, No. 2, ss. 241-248 (1957).
 Andrzej Ehrenfeucht, Andrzej Mostowski, "Models of Axiomatic Theories Admitting Automorphisms", Fundamenta Mathematicae 43, No. 1, ss. 50-68 (1956).

References

External links
 Ehrenfeucht's website at the University of Colorado 
 Breaking away from the mathbook website
 
 

1932 births
Living people
Scientists from Vilnius
People from Wilno Voivodeship (1926–1939)
20th-century American mathematicians
American computer scientists
Polish emigrants to the United States
Polish computer scientists
University of Warsaw alumni
University of Colorado faculty